Clement Lang Hirsch (April 26, 1914 – March 15, 2000) was an American businessman and a prominent Thoroughbred racehorse owner who co-founded Oak Tree Racing Association.

Born in St. Louis, Missouri to a very successful family of retail merchants, Clement Hirsch moved to California as a young man. During World War II he served with the United States Marine Corps and was part of the Guadalcanal Campaign.

In 1936, Clement Hirsch founded the Dog Town Packing Company in Vernon, California which became a highly successful pet food producer he later renamed Kal Kan Foods, Inc. In 1968, Mars, Incorporated acquired the company and today it forms part of their Pedigree Petfoods division. He also was the founder of Stagg Foods of Costa Mesa which he built into the a major producer of canned chili. He sold Stagg Foods in 1996 to Hormel Foods.

In 1963 Clement Hirsch and his second wife Edith Mack Hirsch were divorced. She remarried to actor Desi Arnaz. Married four times, Clement Hirsch had six children from his marriages.

Thoroughbred horse racing
Clement Hirsch purchased his first Thoroughbred racehorse in 1947. A rarity in the racing industry, during his more than fifty years racing horses, Hirsch employed only two trainers. He first hired Robert H. McDaniel Red McDaniel then after he decided to move to Las Vegas, he hired Warren Stute who remained with him for more than forty years.

A member of The Jockey Club, as an owner Clement Hirsch was successful with a number of horses imported from South America, among them the colt Figonero who won the 1969 Hollywood Gold Cup and set a world record for 1⅛ miles in winning the Del Mar Handicap. He was also successful with the filly Magical Maiden who won the 1991 Hollywood Starlet and the 1992 Las Virgenes Stakes. In 1993, Magical Maiden won the Chula Vista Handicap at Del Mar Racetrack, a race that track officials would rename the Clement L. Hirsch Handicap in his honor. Hirsch retired Magical Maiden to broodmare duty. She is the granddam of 2009 Kentucky Derby entrant Papa Clem and the 2021 Breeder's Cup Filly and Mare Sprinter winner Ce Ce through her GI-winning daughter Miss Houdini. Papa Clem and Ce Ce are both owned by Hirsch's son Bo Hirsch. The name "Papa Clem" stems from the name Clement Hirsch's grandchildren called him, and that horse was trained by Gary Stute, Warren Stute's nephew.

While successful racing horses, Clement Hirsch is best remembered in the sport as a co-founder and President of the Oak Tree Racing Association. In 1968 the operators of Del Mar Racetrack in Del Mar, California decided to cancel their fall racing program and to host only a summer meet. Clement Hirsch, along with businessman/racehorse owner Louis R. Rowan, veterinarian Dr. Jack Robbins, and other racing enthusiasts, formed the Oak Tree Racing Association to annually host a fall meet at Santa Anita Park. It would prove to be highly successful and Clement Hirsch would serve as its president from its inception until his death in 2000.

In 1998, Clement Hirsch was awarded the Commissioners Cup by the National Thoroughbred Racing Association. Following his death in 2000, the Oak Tree Racing Association honored him by changing the Oak Tree Turf Championship Stakes to the Clement L. Hirsch Memorial Turf Championship for the 2000 renewal.

References

 Nolan, Laurence C. Fundamental Principles of Family Law (Hirsch vs Mirken) (2005) William S. Hein & Co. 
 Los Angeles Times obituary for Clement L. Hirsch
 Chapman University Board of Trustees
 Profile of Clement L. Hirsch at the California Thoroughbred Breeders Association

1914 births
2000 deaths
United States Marine Corps personnel of World War II
American food company founders
American chief executives of food industry companies
Businesspeople from California
American racehorse owners and breeders
American horse racing industry executives
Jewish American sportspeople
Santa Anita Park
Businesspeople from St. Louis
People from Newport Beach, California
20th-century American businesspeople
20th-century American Jews